Air Vice-Marshal Garry Tunnicliffe,  (born 14 October 1966) is a senior Royal Air Force officer who served as Defence Services Secretary from 2016 to 2019.

Early life and education
Tunnicliffe was educated at Devonport High School for Boys, Durham University (BA History and Politics, 1988) and King's College London (MA Defence Studies, 2001).

RAF career
Tunnicliffe joined the Royal Air Force on 14 August 1988. He became head of the RAF's Team of Management Consultants in 2006, station commander at RAF Halton in December 2008, and Assistant Chief of Staff, Training at No. 22 Group in December 2012. He went on to be Head of Armed Forces Remuneration at the Ministry of Defence in 2014, and became Assistant Chief of the Defence Staff (Personnel) as well as Defence Services Secretary on 27 June 2016. Tunnicliffe was appointed Commander of the Royal Victorian Order for his services as Defence Services Secretary on 27 March 2019. He became Deputy Commandant of the Royal College of Defence Studies on 26 April 2019.

Tunnicliffe was appointed a Companion of the Order of the Bath in the 2022 Birthday Honours.

References

 

1966 births
Alumni of King's College London
Alumni of University College, Durham
Commanders of the Royal Victorian Order
Companions of the Order of the Bath
Living people
People educated at Devonport High School for Boys
Royal Air Force air marshals